JJ Eldridge is a theoretical astrophysicist based in New Zealand. Eldridge is the head of the Department of Physics at the University of Auckland and co-author of The Structure And Evolution Of Stars.

Education and research 
Eldridge obtained their MA and MSci from the University of Cambridge, England. They also obtained their PhD in astrophysics at Cambridge, in the Institute of Astronomy, with a thesis titled 'Progenitors of Core-Collapse Supernovae'. They worked as a postdoctoral researcher at the Institut d'astrophysique de Paris and Queen's University in Belfast, before returning to the Institute of Astrophysics at Cambridge. In 2011 they were appointed lecturer in astrophysics at the University of Auckland in New Zealand.

Eldridge studies the evolution of binary stars using numerical models. At the University of Auckland, together with Elizabeth Stanway, they co-developed the Binary Population and Spectral Synthesis (BPASS) models to study the evolution of stars. They used these models to show that globular clusters were younger than previously thought.

Together with Christopher Adam Tout, they wrote The Structure And Evolution Of Stars, published in 2019 by World Scientific Europe.

Eldridge is a Fellow of the Royal Astronomical Society and Fellow of the Astronomical Society of Australia.

LGBT+ advocacy 
Eldridge is non-binary and is a strong advocate of LGBT+ inclusion. They sit on the Equity committee in the Faculty of Science at the University of Auckland.  They also lead the Trans on Campus and Rainbow Science groups at the university. Their efforts have been recognised as key in winning the Pleiades Bronze Award by the Department of Physics at the University of Auckland. They also work with the Australian Society of Astronomy (ASA) on the Inclusive, Diverse, Equitable Astronomy (IDEA) group. For their work in LGBTI+ inclusion they were shortlisted for the New Zealand LGBTI Hero of the Year Award.

See also 
 LGBT people in science

References

External links 

Living people
Year of birth missing (living people)
Astrophysicists
Alumni of the University of Cambridge
Transgender scientists
Academic staff of the University of Auckland
Transgender non-binary people
20th-century  New Zealand astronomers
21st-century New Zealand astronomers
Fellows of the Royal Astronomical Society
Transgender academics
Non-binary scientists